Cal Sierra Airlines was a start-up airline based in San Diego, California. The airline was the brainchild of former Pan Am Captain Ed Perry.

History
The airline started in 1980 with a route between San Diego and South Lake Tahoe, California, operating Convair 580 aircraft.  The company slogan was Your Airlift to the Chairlift.

The airline had plans for a large start-up with a route system covering the southwest United States.  The initial start-up was a huge success with large load factors.  Its claim to fame was superior in-flight service with flight attendants who wore ski outfits and cowboy hats.  They were the first airline to serve Starbucks coffee in-flight and offered a number of coffee selections in-flight.

The expansion was halted with the PATCO strike in the United States.  Because of the shortage of air traffic controllers in the United States, airlines were not given the authority to add new routes. The new airline was short-lived without the chance to expand. It ceased operations after less than nine months of service in 1981.

See also 
 List of defunct airlines of the United States

External links 

Copy of a Cal Sierra Timetable
Cal Sierra ad

Defunct airlines of the United States
Airlines established in 1980
Airlines disestablished in 1981
1980 establishments in California
1981 disestablishments in California
Airlines based in California